Sac Township is a rural township in Dade County, in the U.S. state of Missouri. It is laid out as a rectangle around the southern half of Stockton Lake, and there are no organized communities within its boundaries. 

Sac Township was named after the Sac River.

References

Townships in Missouri
Townships in Dade County, Missouri